Oregon Trail Scouts is a 1947 American Western film in the Red Ryder film series directed by R. G. Springsteen and written by Earle Snell. The film stars Allan Lane, Robert Blake, Martha Wentworth, Roy Barcroft, Emmett Lynn and Edmund Cobb. The film was released on May 5, 1947, by Republic Pictures.

Plot

Cast   
Allan Lane as Red Ryder
Robert Blake as Little Beaver 
Martha Wentworth as The Duchess
Roy Barcroft as Bill Hunter
Emmett Lynn as Bear Trap
Edmund Cobb as Henchman Jack
Earle Hodgins as The Judge
Ed Cassidy as Mr. Bliss 
Frank Lackteen as Chief Running Fox
Billy Cummings as Barking Squirrel
Jack Kirk as Stagecoach Driver

References

External links 
 

1947 films
American Western (genre) films
1947 Western (genre) films
Republic Pictures films
Films directed by R. G. Springsteen
Films based on comic strips
Films based on American comics
American black-and-white films
1940s English-language films
1940s American films
Red Ryder films